KJTX (104.5 FM) is a radio station  broadcasting a Gospel music format. Licensed to Jefferson, Texas, United States, the station serves the Longview-Marshall area.  The station is currently owned by Wisdom Ministries, Inc.

References

External links

Gospel radio stations in the United States
JTX